is both the thirteenth entry of Toei Company's Super Sentai metaseries and the first title of the Heisei period. it was aired on TV Asahi on February 25, 1989, to February 23, 1990, replacing  Choujyu Sentai Liveman and was replaced by Chikyu Sentai Fiveman with a total of 51 episodes (1 TV special and 50 ordinary episodes). Its international title in English was listed by Toei is Turbo Rangers. Turboranger was also the first Super Sentai series to air on Friday instead of Saturday.

During its initial run, Turboranger was the 11th Super Sentai and billed as the 10th anniversary title of the Super Sentai series (as Battle Fever J was designated as the first Super Sentai series during 1988 to 1994 after the exclusion of Himitsu Sentai Gorenger and J.A.K.Q. Dengekitai due to rights issues with Shotaro Ishinomori). However, in 1995, Gorenger and J.A.K.Q. was included into the Super Sentai series once more, thus making Turboranger the 13th in the franchise.

Plot
20,000 years ago, the Fairy race assisted humans in a battle against the Bouma Tribe and the successful sealing of them. Due to modern day pollution and man's destruction of nature, the power of the Fairy magic has weakened, allowing the seal to be broken and thus the Tribe's escape. With the help of Dr. Dazai; Seelon, the last of the fairies summons five high school seniors. As children, they were showered with the "flames of spirit" of the fallen fairies in a forest and can now hear Seelon's voice. Donning powered suits, the product of a collaboration between Seelon's magic and Dr. Dazai's science, the five become the Turborangers, juggling days of fighting with their regular school lives, in order to defeat the Bouma Tribe.

Characters

Turborangers
The five rangers are all high school students of Musashino Academy.
 /: A brave high school baseball team captain. An ace pitcher, his technique is the "Demonball of Fire/Honoo" and dreams of becoming a professional. Despite his apparent hyperactivity disorder, Riki has a high sense of justice and confidence. He is the kind of person who is not in good graces with his teacher due to his low grades which is seen earlier. He shows his unusual amount of power in matters like when he defeats Zimba on their final duel. He also kills Rehda in the middle of the battle with the Super Bouma Beast which he rushed into out of impulsiveness. Riki was captured by Wandering Bouma and forced to pit against Ragorn where after a hard battle, he underwent near death but he managed to win by inflicting a mortal wound on Ragorn's heart at a desperate attempt. He pulled the team together during the final battle. Riki would appear years later to grant the Greater Power of the Turborangers to the Gokaigers during Kaizoku Sentai Gokaiger, but the Greater Power would never be used onscreen.  
Weapons: , which can combine with the Turbo Laser Sword Mode.
Attacks: 
 /: A patient track star who is also a good student giving him the fame of "Running Brain" which is in contrast to Riki. He shows his team concern and is self-sacrificing even when he placed himself at risk to be able to have the Turbo Rugger completed. Daichi is a reliable second in command who will always be for support of his teammates. He once befriended the monster Sumo Bouma whom he defeated in a sumo battle and granted the demon rest. He defeated Jarmin in battle after helping Dr. Dazai get the parts to complete the Turbo Rugger.
Weapons: 
 /: A swimmer and high diver. He is very good at aquatic battle. He is prone to chasing girls. He was once forced to clean the whole school due to his serious misbehavior problems. He once befriended a Bouma named Bell, whose people were oppressed by the evil Jarmin and caught inside a series of bells.
Weapons: , which can combine with the Turbo Laser Gun Mode to form the J-Machine Gun.
 /: He is a gymnast and almost behaves like a feral child. He was in love with a girl he only knew as "Sayo-chan" when younger, never realizing it was actually Sayoko Tsukikage/Kirika. He has a younger brother named Shunji who was killed in a hit and run, therefore he befriends a Bouma Beast who had a falling out with his brother.
Weapons: 
 /: A student council president and the brightest student in school. She is popular, everyone looks up to her. Gifted with acting skills, she was able to fool both Bouma and the other Turborangers to get the medicine and save Yohei's life.
Weapons: , which can be combined with Turbo Laser in gun mode.

Arsenal
 : The Turborangers' two-piece transformation devices. The left bracelet with a turbine activates the transformation, while the right bracelet is a communicator. The transformation call is either "Turboranger!" or the individual Turboranger's hero name "(Color) Turbo!".
 : Turborangers' sidearms that can be used as a laser gun or transformed into a sword.

Team Attacks
 : Turborangers use their Turbo Lasers to form a plasma ball to kill the opponent.
 : The various attack formations utilized by all five Turborangers and their respective weapons.
 : A weapon later added and used to defeat more powerful Bouma, but was not used on any of the troopers. Its energy source is the Turbo Attacker's V Turbo Engine, which docks inside of the V Turbo Bazooka before firing.

Vehicles
 : The motorcycles for each ranger, numbers 01 and 05. Their maximum speed is 360 km/h.
 : Personal vehicle of Red Turbo, a buggy. An alternate vehicle for Red Turbo when not using Mach Turbo 1. The Turbo Attacker is armed with the side-mounted  and the roof-mounted .

Mecha
 : A giant robot formed from five automobiles by the command . It was badly damaged by Zimba in episode 28 and it caused it to break the combination of the mecha. It returned at episode 30 to help the buried Turbo Rugger.
 : A grand tourer driven by Red Turbo. It is stored to the left of the Turbo Truck and the right of the Turbo Jeep. It forms the Turbo Robo's head, chest, and back. Its top speed is Mach 1.2. Its front wheels turn parallel to the chassis when the Turbo GT is flying. It appeared again in the Gaoranger vs Super Sentai.
 : A race truck driven by Black Turbo. It forms the Turbo Robo's body, arms and upper legs and the Turbo Shield and the Turbo Cannon. It is stored to the left of Turbo Wagon and the right of Turbo GT. Its top speed is 980 kilometers per hour. After the Turbo Robo's defeat in episode 28, its combination was broken down and was damaged badly as well by Jimba. Daichi also used it as a lure to make sure that the Rugger Fighter was completed in episode 29. It was repaired in episode 30.
 : A sport utility vehicle driven by Blue Turbo. It fires the Jeep Gattlers. It is stored to the left of the Turbo GT. It forms the Turbo Robo's left foot. Its top speed is 850 kilometers per hour.
 : A dune buggy driven by Yellow Turbo. It uses the Wire Grappler. It is stored to the right of the Turbo Wagon. It forms the Turbo Robo's right foot. Its top speed is 830 kilometers per hour.
 : A station wagon driven by Pink Turbo. It is stored to the left of the Turbo Buggy and the right of the Turbo Truck. It forms the Turbo Robo's lower legs. Its top speed is 620 kilometers per hour.
 : The Turborangers' second robot that transforms from the  airship. When the command  is given, the Rugger Fighter's cockpit forms Turbo Rugger's back, the underside becomes the arms, and the sides become the legs, with the afterburners as the feet, the rest forms the chest, revealing the head. Turbo Rugger's head and chest forms the Super Turbo Robo's own head (with a special helmet) and chest, the legs become the arms, and the feet as the Super Turbo Robo's own. It was first used to destroy an enlarged Jarmin in battle and was nearly destroyed by the mighty Super Violent Demon Beast.
 : The combination of the Turbo Robo and the Turbo Rugger formed when the command  is given. The size of the Turbo Robo and the Turbo Rugger increases so much in the combination that it cannot walk, though it can move its arms. It was first used to destroy the mighty Super Violent Demon Beast.
 : The Turborangers' base which launches the Turbo Machines and the Rugger Fighter before it combines with Super Turbo Robo to form the Super Turbo Builder. It transforms to a humanoid form when the command  is given. It overheated in the finale and Zulten died in assaulting this base.
 : The combination of Super Turbo Robo and Turbo Builder. It is formed when the command  is given.

Allies
 : A scientist who was contacted by Seelon and assisted in the invention of the Turborangers' mecha. Being a car enthusiast, he based their mecha and suits on vehicles and also had been experimenting on a non-contaminant engine. A slight eccentric who longs for the Turborangers' teacher, Yamaguchi.
 : The last surviving Fairy with a height of 8 centimeters (approximately 3 1/4 inches) tall. She can only be seen with the naked eye by the Turborangers; Dazai invented goggles that allows him to see her. She teamed with Dr. Dazai to stop the Tribes. She befriends Saint Beast Rakia. She can emit a "Shine of the Soul" that temporarily disorients enemies, but can be fatal to her. She lives in a small, reconstructed doll house made for her by Dr. Dazai. She is not afraid to dive into danger to assist the Turborangers. After the finale, she becomes a star with Rakia.
 : A white-maned, winged holy beast defender of Earth, the keeper of peace and guardian of fairies. He fought the Bouma long ago and sealed many of them, sealing himself near Bouma Castle. However the pollution of the Earth gravely weakened Rakia to being forced to negate the seal on Bouma Castle. He left the task of restoring peace to the future of the Earth to the Turborangers before dying and becoming a constellation to watch over them.
 : The Turborangers' homeroom teacher. Her subject is math. A gentle and well-liked teacher, the five Turborangers are not in her good graces for how often they shirk their classes and extracurricular activities to take part in fighting (although it is unknown to her why they are always absent). She dislikes Dr. Dazai, believing he plays a part in corrupting the five. She is a fan of sumo wrestling. She has a younger sister named Mika who studies martial arts. She finds of the five's secret lives as Turborangers in the finale, boarding the Turbo Base to give them words of inspiration.
 : Classmate of Shunsuke Hino/Yellow Turbo. The first ordinary human being who is able to break the seal of the Bouma Beast. Since she is the one who frees Toritsuki Bouma, she is forced to help him steal the energy of a human child by playing her flute. Her conversation with Shunsuke helps her gain the courage to betray Toritsuki Bouma and foil his goal.
 : Appears in episode 36. She is the little sister of Misa. She loves her sister more than anything and therefore hates the Turborangers for hiding something from Misa, while Misa cannot stop worrying them all the times. She later finds out Turborangers' true identities and learns to understand the situation. In the end, she does not tell her sister about the Turborangers and let her find out about it herself. After discovering the Turborangers' true identities, she stops hating them and befriends them instead.

Bouma Tribe
The  is a crime faction, where they are worshippers of violence and magic who lost to human-Fairy coalition 20,000 years ago and were sealed away. In the finale, Bouma Castle is destroyed by the Super Turbo Builder.

 :  The absolute dictator of the Bouma. He is initially partly immobile as he can still move his head and arms, he always remained seated on his throne with a set of tentacles that can stretch which he uses to punish his subordinates when they fail him.  He is shown as merciless and cruel to everyone. He ends up sending Jarmin to her death after witnessing Zimba's brave sacrifice and that Yamimaru defeated the Turbo Robo. He sends Rehda to have his new Super Bouma Beast try to destroy the Turborangers.  After Rehda and the Super Bouuma Beast were both killed, he decides to punish Zulten with his powers for cowardice. He 'dies' after the conspiracy of Yamimaru and Kirika, who decided to kidnap Riki and pit him against Ragorn in a one-on-one battle to the death.  Riki mortally wounds him with a stab at the heart, causing him to receive explosions while Zulten only watched helplessly from a distance, not able to lift a finger to help him because of the red thread barrier Yamimaru and Kirika placed to trap him with Red Turbo. However, he becomes mobile after retrieving the monster-enlarging orb, he tries to kill Red Turbo and he grows giant and decides to punish the two traitors Yamimaru and Kirika for their treachery.  He was then 'destroyed' by Super Turbo Builder. He later revives himself by consuming energies of hatred and sadness around him, and becomes the gold-skinned and mobile . He faces the Turborangers as a giant in the finale in which he is destroyed for good by the Super Turbo Robo.
 : A bearded mystic genius with an ammonite-like head and a human face. He is second in command. Intelligent and cruel, he hates humanity and his schemes always involve the use of human deeds against humans themselves and mass killings of humans as well.  He is usually portrayed to be the kind of field commander who does not show up often and works closely with Ragorn, receiving less ire and is entrusted with the most dangerous of operations. He is very skilled in witchcraft making him a powerful sorcerer. He was later sent to take care of the Turborangers with the Super Bouma Beast when both Jarmin and Jimba died where he almost buried them alive seeking revenge for Ragorn, as he was entrusted. When he saw the Turbo Robo pass by, he used his efforts to lure Red Turbo out to a battle hoping to divide the Turborangers. In that battle, Red Turbo and Rehda duel to the death. He reveals his illusion powers from his cape in an attempt to wipe out Red Turbo even with the ghosts of Jarmin and Zimba. However, Red Turbo managed to counter his attacks by slashing his cape, mortally wounded him and performed a GT Slash which inevitably killed him where he exploded violently as he uttered his final words in an illusion form cursing the Turborangers.
 : A samurai-like keikō-wearing masked warrior in black armor, expert in all martial arts with a mastery of swords. He loves to hate, a sadistic madman who takes pleasure in human suffering, especially when it comes to love. The reason from this was that Zimba was originally a man who fought a powerful army to win the heart of a princess he loved. However, when the fight left him near death, Zimba's final moments were the horrifying knowledge that the princess was disgusted by his ugly appearance and never loved him. He died soon after, his spirit burdened by his grudge and transforming his corpse into a Bouma.  He is in love with Jarmin as well but denies it at times.  When Ragorn becomes furious of how the Turborangers defeat them everything, Zimba protects Jarmin from their leader's rage while volunteering to finish the Turborangers once and far all.  He bade farewell to Jarmin with a slashed bell who was sad to see him leave worrying he may never return.  He was able to stop the Turborangers from being able to transform for a time but he was defeated by Red Turbo with a GT Crash and was finished off by the others with shots from the Turbo Laser. Yamimaru saw the opportunity to use him and he was enlarged which he defeated the Turbo Robo.  However he was defeated by the Turbo Builder.
 : A cold-hearted magician whose face becomes serpentine whenever angered, motivated to attack humans out of envy and spite while using a whip as her weapon in battle. Her tactics involve deception like when she forced the Ice and Fire Bouma to fight for her.  It was insinuated by Zulten that she used the Sigh Bouma to impress her lover Zimba but she reacted by whipping him.  When Ragorn got mad and decided to punish the others, she attempted to beg to Ragorn but her lover Zimba intervened to save her from death.  She was hurt to see Zimba bid her farewell with a slashed bell fearing he may never return.  When Zimba was killed, she was hurt as she had feelings for him holding the bell that Zimba slashed earlier. She was sentenced to death by Ragorn after Zimba's death where she released her ally Kuroko Bouma.  The downside was that whatever happened to her monster also happened to her.  She fused her soul with her other half but was destroyed by the Turbo Rugger.
 : A fat, disgusting creature able to turn into an ATV-like vehicle for Jarmin. He is armed with a slingshot. A cheat who does anything to win; weak willed, always sucking up to superiors. He was the last of the original four bad guys serving Ragorn to be killed. He was not in good graces with Ragorn for his cowardice (and serves as a scapegoat after the death of Rehda, he also tried to use Zulten Metal Type to win his position back) and remained hidden at times afterward but shows up at times especially after Rehda's death and during the arrival of Yamimaru and Kirika and remained unable to help his master during the battle of Red Turbo and Ragorn due to the red thread barrier placed by Yamimaru. He sided with the Wandering Bouma fearing his death but returned loyalty to Ragorn afterward being the type to side with whoever is in charge. He was killed when he tried to perform an assault on the Turbo Builder via fighter jets.
 : The foot soldiers under Ragorn's services, the black-skinned Ular are a Bouma Tribe and have the ability to merge into ball-shaped Ular Dumplings. Once unsealed by Rehda with the Ular's prayers, Ular Bouma finds the Ular Road, which Japan National Route 44 was built on, and released the vast army of Ular sealed there. Then, to show his kind's unwavering loyalty to Ragorn, Ular Bouma has some of his Ular sacrifice themselves to invoke an earthquake to wipe out the human population. However, the Turborangers stop the scheme and the enlarged Ular Bouma was destroyed by the Turbo Robo's Turbo Cannon. The Ulars since vowed to kill the Turborangers to avenge their fallen leader.

Wandering Bouma
The  are Yōkai, the offspring of humans and demons.
 : A Wandering Bouma who was refused from being a member of the 100 Violent Demon Tribes. Because he was half-demon, he was not sealed and simply wandered Earth for 20,000 years to obtain as much knowledge as he could, while never being accepted by people. His plan is to destroy both humans and Bouma and let the Wandering Bouma as the only ones. Originally shaggy-haired, he later gains flashy red and black armor after the death of Rehda and with the help of Kirika. Before that, when he saw Zimba dead, he decided to use him at his own advantage to defeat the Turbo Robo by enlarging Zimba. He rides the giant bat Dragras which was destroyed when it sacrificed itself to destroy the monster Sealing Bouma. He plotted the downfall of Ragorn along with Kirika. He apparently succeeded in Ragorn's supposed death by kidnapping Red Turbo and having the two battle against each other. He took charge of the Tribes until Ragorn's resurrection, when he was almost killed if not saved by Kirika. He became peaceful in the end possibly because he was in love with Kirika.
Weapons  , Yami Knife, Dark Bow, 
 : Another Wandering Bouma. She originally lived as a normal girl named  until she learned that she is Wandering Bouma on her 18th birthday, shortly after finding that the man and woman who raised(and protected her for 20,000 years) were really just Skull Monsters. As Tsukikage, was an outcast in school who secretly loved Riki. She is permanently connected to Yamimaru through the "red thread of fate." Cruel and lacking compassion, her resentment of humans stems from her life of being bullied. She is repulsed that the blood running through her is a mixture of human and demon, deciding to call herself a full-fledged demon and throw away her humanity for Yamimaru, resulting in his power-up and her armor. She combined with the monster Armor Bouma to become Armored Kirika. Near the final, she and Yamimaru meets Kirika's true father, a peaceful demon named , who tells them of how much he loved Kirika's fellow peaceful, human mother, who wanted for both sides to coexist and this begins to break the hatred of Kirika and causes her to cease fighting. Because she knows the hatred and loneliness that Yamimaru has been suffered for 20,000 years, she wishes him to release his hatred so she tries to persuade him. In the finale, she manages to save Yamimaru and left to live a peaceful life with him, as Sayoko and Hikaru.
Weapons  five-pointed ringknife,

Episodes
Before the very first story arc premiered in the second episode the following week, the first episode acted as a television special was aired to commemorate the tenth anniversary of Super Sentai since Battle Fever J at that time. On October 6, 1989 (the day that episode 32 aired) the show began to be broadcast later on Fridays instead of Saturdays. A movie was released at the Toei Manga Festival on March 18, 1989, which was the same day episode 4 aired.

1The first episode of Turboranger was originally scheduled to premiere on February 25, 1989. However, due to the death of Hirohito on January 7, the finale of Liveman was postponed to February 18, thus moving the premiere of Turboranger to March 4.

Cast
 Riki Honoo: Kenta Satou
 Daichi Yamagata: Yoshiaki Ganaha
 Yohei Hama: Keiya Asakura
 Shunsuke Hino: Junichiro Katagiri
 Haruna Morikawa: Yoshiko Kinohara
 Dr. Dazai: Fujita Okamoto
 Seelon: Mayumi Omura
 Rakia: Banjo Ginga
 Misa Yamaguchi: Kyoko Takami
 Ragorn: Takeshi Watabe
 Doctor Rehda: Masashi Ishibashi
 Princess Jarmin: Kanako Kishi
 Zimba: Seiichi Hirai
 Zulten: Hideyuki Umezu
 Hikaru Nagareboshi/Yamimaru: Yoshinori Tanaka
 Sayoko Tsukikage/Kirika: Masako Morishita

Guest stars
 Mika: Keiko Hayase (episode 37)
 Yukari: Miho Tojo (episode 35)
 Rin: Hiromi Yuhara (episode 27)
 Yumi Sakakibara:  Sayuri Uchida (episode 09)

Songs
Opening theme
Kousoku Sentai Turboranger 
Lyrics: 
Composition: 
Arrangement 
Artist: 

Ending theme

Lyrics: Ikki Matsumoto
Composition: Yoshimasa Inoue
Arrangement: Ryō Yonemitsu
Artist: Kenta Satō

Final Theme

Lyrics: Ikki Matsumoto
Artist: Kenta Satō

International Broadcasts and Home Video
In its' home country of Japan, this was the very first Super Sentai series since Kagaku Sentai Dynaman to have episodes officially released on home video in the form of VHS by Toei from November 1993 to March 1994. Not counting the theatrical releases, as all were released on the format. However, only 30 out of 51 episodes were released on VHS and spread throughout six volumes with five episodes each, with some episodes skipped. However, it would later be released on DVD from May 21, 2012 to September 21, 2012 and for the first time, this release has all 51 episodes included spread through five volumes. The first four having 10 episodes, the last one holding 11. Later on April 8, 2020, A Low-priced DVD collection was released with all episodes featured spread across two volumes with the first volume having 25 episodes, the second volume having 26.
In France, the series aired with a French dub on May 16, 1990, on TF1's Club Dorothée block as Turboranger. This was the fifth Super Sentai series to air in the country. But the pilot episode was not dubbed as only episodes 2 through 29 were aired dubbed. Episodes 30 and 31 were actually also dubbed, but they were not shown due to hardware issues while the other episodes were unaired. 
In Hong Kong, it aired on TVB Jade from October 10, 1990, and ended on September 21, 1991, with all episodes dubbed in Cantonese Chinese. 
In Spain, it aired as Turbo Rangers and this was the second Super Sentai series to air with a Castilian Spanish dub on July 19, 1992 on Televisión Española (TVE1 and TVE2.
In the Philippines, it was dubbed in Tagalog on ABS-CBN from 1992 to 1993 and re-aired on IBC in the late 1990's.
In Indonesia, the series aired in the 1990s on RCTI with an Indonesian dub and aired under Pasukan Turbo.
In South Korea, it was imported by Hyundai Trade and dubbed in Korean by Sungwoo Media, first it aired on television in 1992 and later directly being released to the home video market, known as Turbo Guerrilla (터보 유격대). Currently as for the Korean dub of Kaizoku Sentai Gokaiger, It was officially renamed as Power Rangers Turboranger.
In Thailand, Channel 3 aired the series with a Thai dub. Video Square later released a second Thai dub for home video later on for VCD and DVD.
This series along with the previous one Choujyu Sentai Liveman were already both-licensed to be aired in Brazil in the mid-1990's to be given a Brazilian Portuguese dub as merchandise were appearing locally. However, this fell through as Power Rangers was proven to be more popular to air and Saban was weighing competition in most international markets, when they adapted Toei's work. As a result, Turboranger was not aired in the region.

Notes

References

External links
 Official Kousoku Sentai Turboranger website 

Super Sentai
1989 Japanese television series debuts
1990 Japanese television series endings
Japanese fantasy television series
Japanese high school television series
TV Asahi original programming
1980s Japanese television series
1990s Japanese television series
Demons in television
Works about cars